Between the Lines is the seventh studio album by American singer-songwriter Janis Ian, released in 1975 by Columbia Records. The album was recorded and mixed at 914 Sound Studios in Blauvelt, New York, with production helmed by Brooks Arthur. The album reached number one on the Billboard album chart in September 1975, and has sold 1.9 million copies in the United States.

The song "At Seventeen" was released as a single and reached number three on the Billboard Hot 100 and topped the Adult Contemporary chart. Ian won the 1975 Grammy Award for Best Female Pop Vocal Performance for the song, and performed it on the first episode of Saturday Night Live on October 11, 1975. In 2000 it was voted number 590 in Colin Larkin's All Time Top 1000 Albums.

Track listing

Personnel
Produced by Brooks Arthur
Engineered by Brooks Arthur, Larry Alexander, Russ Payne
Art Direction and Design: John Berg, Paul Perlow
Photography: Peter Cunningham
Production Coordinator: Herb Gart
Musicians
Al Gorgoni, Janis Ian, Sal DiTroia, Dave Snider, Dickie Frank – guitar
Don Payne, Richard Davis, George Duvivier – bass
Barry Lazarowitz – drums, percussion
Larry Alexander – percussion
Kenny Kosek, Russell George – fiddle

Orchestra
Arianna Bronne, Lewis Cley, Peter Dimitriades, Marie Hence, Max Hollander, Kathryn Kienke, Ezra Kliger, Harold Kohon, Harry Lookofsky, Joe Malin, David Sackson, Julius Schachter, Ora Shiran, Harry Urbont, Masako Yanagita - violin
Seymour Berman, George Brown, Eugenie Dengel, Patty Kopec, Richard Maximoff, David Sackson, Emanuel Vardi - viola
Seymour Barab, Gloria Lanzarone, Beverly Lauridsen, Jesse Levy, Charles McCracken, George Ricci - cello
Ray Crisara, Burt Collins, Jimmy Sedlar, Joe Shepley - trumpet
Eddie Bert, Mickey Gravine, Alan Raph, Bill Watrous - trombone
Jim Buffington - French horn
Romeo Penque, Phil Bodner - flute
Burt Collins - flugelhorn
Seldon Powell - tenor saxophone
Ron Frangipane - string and horn arrangements
Artie Kaplan - orchestral contractor 
Recorded and Mixed at 914 Sound Studios in Blauvelt, New York, USA

Charts

Weekly charts

Year-end charts

References

Janis Ian albums
1975 albums
Columbia Records albums
Albums produced by Brooks Arthur
Grammy Award for Best Engineered Album, Non-Classical